Mashable is a news website, digital media platform and entertainment company founded by Pete Cashmore in 2005.

History 
Mashable was founded by Pete Cashmore while living in Aberdeen, Scotland, in July 2005. Early iterations of the site were a simple WordPress blog, with Cashmore as sole author. Fame came relatively quickly, with Time magazine noting Mashable as one of the 25 best blogs of 2009. As of November 2015, it had over 6,000,000 Twitter followers and over 3,200,000 fans on Facebook. In June 2016, it acquired YouTube channel CineFix from Whalerock Industries.

In December 2017, Ziff Davis bought Mashable for $50 million, a price described by Recode as a "fire sale" price. Mashable had not been meeting its advertising targets, accumulating $4.2 million in losses in the quarter ending September 2017. After the sale, Mashable laid off 50 staff, but preserved top management. Under Ziff Davis, Mashable has grown and expanded to many countries in multiple continents, including Europe, Asia, the Middle East and Australia in several languages.

In June 2021, Jessica Coen, Mashable's editor-in-chief, left the company to join Morning Brew.

Mashable Awards

On 27 November 2007, Mashable launched the 1st International Open Web Awards to recognize the best online communities and services.  Voting was conducted online through Mashable and its 24 blog partners. On 10 January 2008 at the Palace Hotel, San Francisco, Mashable announced the winners of the first Open Web Awards. Winners included Digg, Facebook, Google, Twitter, YouTube, ESPN, Cafemom and Pandora.

The 2nd Annual Open Web Awards was an online international competition that took place between November and December 2008. Among the winners in the "People's Choice" component were Encyclopedia Dramatica in the wiki category, Digg in the "Social News and Social Bookmarking" category, Netlog in the "Mainstream and Large Social Networks" category and MySpace in the "Places and Events" category.

The 3rd Open Web Awards were held in November and December 2009. Winners included Pandora Radio for best mobile music site or app, Fish Wrangler for best Facebook game, and "Surprise Marriage Proposal in Spain" as best YouTube video, and Music Blog World As I Der See It! published by Derek Michael Sheldon for Best Blogger to Follow.

In 2010, Mashable renamed the Open Web Awards to the 4th Annual Mashable Awards.  The Mashable Awards officially launched on 27 September 2010 with nominations for categories including Best Mobile Game, Best Use of an API, Best Web Video, Most Promising New Company and Entrepreneur of the Year. Winners included HootSuite for Best Social Media Management Tool, ReachLocal for Best Social Media Service for Small Business, iPad for Best New Gadget, and Angry Birds for Best Mobile Game.

See also

 BuzzFeed
The Onion
Upworthy
 Vice Media
Vox Media

References

Internet properties established in 2005
2005 establishments in Scotland
American technology news websites
Websites about digital media
2017 mergers and acquisitions